The discography of Black Country Communion, an English-American hard rock band, consists of four studio albums, one live album, one single, one video album and nine music videos. Formed in Los Angeles, California in 2009, Black Country Communion is a supergroup composed of bassist and vocalist Glenn Hughes, guitarist and vocalist Joe Bonamassa, drummer Jason Bonham and keyboardist Derek Sherinian. Working with producer Kevin Shirley, the band released its self-titled debut album through J&R Adventures and Mascot Records in September 2010. The album reached number 54 on the Billboard 200, number 13 on the UK Albums Chart, the top 20 of the US Billboard Hard Rock Albums and Top Rock Albums charts, and topped the UK Rock & Metal Albums Chart.

The following year, the group quickly returned with Black Country Communion 2, which reached number 71 on the Billboard 200, number 23 on the UK Albums Chart, the top 20 of both Billboard rock albums charts, and topped the UK Rock & Metal Albums Chart. A music video was released for the track "Man in the Middle", which was directed by Davin Maske. Later in 2011, the band released its first video album Live Over Europe, recorded during a European tour that year, which reached the top ten of the UK Music Video Chart and in several other European regions. Live Over Europe was released as a live album in February 2012, reaching number 23 on the US Hard Rock Albums chart, number 110 on the UK Albums Chart, and number two on the UK Rock & Metal Albums Chart.

In October 2012, the band released its third studio album Afterglow, which reached the top 50 of the Billboard 200 and number two on the UK Rock & Metal Albums Chart. In March 2013, Bonamassa left Black Country Communion due to internal tensions with Hughes, with the bassist later confirming that the band had ended. However, in April 2016 it was announced that Black Country Communion planned to reunite and return in 2017 with a new studio album, with Hughes and Bonamassa beginning songwriting later in September. BCCIV was released in September 2017, preceded by the single and music video for "Collide". The album was the band's first to reach the top ten of the UK Albums Chart, debuting at number 7. It reached number 102 on the US Billboard 200.

Albums

Studio albums

Live albums

Singles

Other charted songs

Videos

Video albums

Music videos

References

External links
Black Country Communion discography at AllMusic

Black Country Communion
Black Country Communion
Black Country Communion